Francesco Sforza (1562–1624) was an Italian cardinal and bishop.

Biography

Background and early career in the military

A member of the House of Sforza, Francesco Sforza was born in Parma on 6 November 1562, the son of Sforza Sforza and his second wife Caterina de' Nobili. He was count of Santa Fiora, marquis of Varci and Castel Acquaro.  He was the nephew of Cardinals Guido Ascanio Sforza di Santa Fiora, Roberto de' Nobili, and Alessandro Sforza, and the grand-nephew of Pope Paul III.

He received a military education under Ottavio Farnese, Duke of Parma and later at the court of Francesco I de' Medici, Grand Duke of Tuscany.  He also studied Latin, rhetoric, mathematics, philosophy, and politics.  He married the sister of Francesco I de' Medici, Grand Duke of Tuscany.  At age 18, he served in Flanders under his cousin Alexander Farnese, Duke of Parma; he commanded Italian troops.

Early ecclesiastical career

Following his wife's death, his sister Costanza Sforza, duchess of Sora, who was married to Giacomo Boncompagni, the legitimized son of Pope Gregory XIII, encouraged him to pursue an ecclesiastical career.  He became a cleric in Rome and rose quickly in the church, first becoming a canon of the cathedral chapter of San Nicola in Carcere before he had even been ordained as a priest.

Cardinalate

Pope Gregory XIII made him a cardinal deacon in the consistory of 12 December 1583.  He received the red hat and the deaconry of San Giorgio in Velabro on 6 January 1584.  He participated in the papal conclave of 1585 that elected Pope Sixtus V; in the first papal conclave of 1590 that elected Pope Urban VII; in the second papal conclave of 1590 that elected Pope Gregory XIV; in the papal conclave of 1591 that elected Pope Innocent IX; and in the papal conclave of 1592 that elected Pope Clement VIII.

From 20 July 1591 until 1597 he was papal legate in Romagna, where he was charged with ridding the province of bandits, which he accomplished.  He represented Pope Clement VIII at the baptism of his nephew Cosimo II de' Medici, Grand Duke of Tuscany.  He accompanied the pope to Ferrara in 1598.  He participated in the first papal conclave of 1605 that elected Pope Leo XI and the second papal conclave of 1605 that elected Pope Paul V.  He crowned Pope Paul V in the papal coronation held on 29 May 1605.

He was ordained as a priest in 1614.  On 13 November 1617 he opted for the order of cardinal priests and received the titular church of San Matteo in Via Merulana.  He became the protopriest.

He opted for the order of cardinal bishops on 5 March 1618, receiving the Suburbicarian Diocese of Albano.  He was consecrated as a bishop by Pope Paul V in the apostolic chapel of the Quirinal Palace on 1 May 1618.  He opted for the Suburbicarian Diocese of Frascati on 6 April 1620.

He participated in the papal conclave of 1621 that elected Pope Gregory XV and in the papal conclave of 1623 that elected Pope Urban VIII.

On 27 September 1623 he opted for the Suburbicarian Diocese of Porto-Santa Rufina.  He was Vice-Dean of the College of Cardinals.

He died in Rome on 9 September 1624.  He was buried in San Bernardo alle Terme.

References

1562 births
1624 deaths
17th-century Italian cardinals
House of Sforza